Lichfield Record Office held the archives for the City of Lichfield and its immediate vicinity. The archives are held at The Friary, Lichfield, and run by Staffordshire County Council.

Lichfield Record Office closed on 1 January 2018 and its collections moved to Staffordshire Record Office.

References

Lichfield
Archives in Staffordshire
History of Staffordshire